NOLF may refer to:

The Operative: No One Lives Forever, a 2000 video game
 Naval outlying landing field, a type of U.S. Navy military airfield (e.g. Naval Outlying Landing Field Spencer).